Oxyurus may refer to:
 Oxyurus (millipede), a genus of millipedes in the family Xystodesmidae
 Oxyurus, a genus of wasps in the family Scelionidae, synonym of Sparasion
 Oxyurus, a genus of birds in the family Furnariidae, synonym of Aphrastura